Judge Sanborn may refer to:

Arthur Loomis Sanborn (1850–1920), judge for the United States District Court for the Western District of Wisconsin
John B. Sanborn Jr. (1883–1964), judge of the United States Court of Appeals for the Eighth Circuit
Walter Henry Sanborn (1845–1928), judge of the United States Court of Appeals for the Eighth Circuit